Yesica Luciana Hernández Ferrando (born 16 September 1988) is a Uruguayan football manager and former player, who played as a midfielder. She has been a member of the Uruguay women's national team.

Early life
Hernández hails from Ombúes de Lavalle.

College career
Hernández attended the Missouri Valley College in the United States.

Club career
Hernández played in Uruguay for Colón.

International career
Hernández played for Uruguay at senior level in the 2014 Copa América Femenina.

Personal life
Hernández is vegetarian.

References 

1988 births
Living people
Women's association football midfielders
Women's association football forwards
Uruguayan women's footballers
People from Colonia Department
Uruguay women's international footballers
Missouri Valley College alumni
Colón F.C. players
Uruguayan expatriate women's footballers
Uruguayan expatriate sportspeople in the United States
Expatriate women's soccer players in the United States
Women's association football managers
Uruguayan football managers
Female association football managers
Uruguayan expatriate football managers
Expatriate soccer managers in the United States
Youth Olympic gold medalists for Uruguay